The Arya Marriage Validation Act, 1937 (Act No. 19 of 1937) is a legislation enacted by the British government in India during the pre-independence era to recognize inter marriages among Arya Samajis.

Background 
Arya Samajis, who formed an appreciable number of Indians, believed that the caste system prevailing in British ruled India was not in consonance with the sacred Shastra and scriptures. British rulers never tried to interfere with the customary marriage laws prevailing among different sects of the society. However, when people from various sects, who opposed the caste system and fed up with the deteriorating condition of the Hinduism, adopted concept of Arya Samaj and became Arya Samajis. Marriages took place between the Arya Samajis irrespective of the fact that prior to the marriage both the bride and bridegroom belonged to different caste or sub castes other than Hindu. As such they feared that these marriages could be declared invalid solely on the point that the parties before the marriage belonged to different castes between whom marriage was not permissible as per the custom prevailing at that time.

In order to address such an issue the select committee proposed a legislation which was enacted  in order to validate all such marriages and recognize the marriage between two Arya Samajis as valid.

Text of sec.2 of the act 
Section 2 of the act was meant to validate all such marriages between Arya Samajis and this is the only substantial provision of the act:

References

External links 
 "Arya Marriage Validation Act, 1937"

Arya Samajis
Marriage law in India